, or officially , is a district of Chūō, Tokyo, Japan.

Muromachi is a business district, home to a number of long-established companies.

Geography
Located on the western part of Chūō, Nihonbashi-Muromachi borders Kajichō, Chiyoda.

Rivers and Bridges
Nihonbashi River
Nihonbashi Bridge
Edobashi Bridge

Companies
Mitsui Fudosan

Places

Sembikiya
Nihonbashi Mitsui Tower
Mitsukoshi Department Store Nihonbashi Main Branch

Education
Public elementary and junior high schools are operated by Chuo City Board of Education.

Muromachi is zoned to Tokiwa Elementary School (常盤小学校) and Nihonbashi Junior High School (日本橋中学校).

References

Districts of Chūō, Tokyo
Nihonbashi, Tokyo